Sayyid Ali bin Said al-Busaidi, GCSI,  (1854 – March 5, 1893) was the fourth Sultan of Zanzibar. He ruled Zanzibar from February 13, 1890, to March 5, 1893. In June 1890 he was forced to accept a British protectorate over his dominions.

He was succeeded by his nephew, Hamad bin Thuwaini Al-Busaid.

Honours
Knight Grand Commander of the Order of the Star of India (GCSI)-1890

References

1854 births
1893 deaths
Al Said dynasty
Ali bin Said
Honorary Knights Grand Commander of the Order of the Star of India
Zanzibari royalty
19th-century Arabs
19th-century Omani people